Calenzana is a commune in the Haute-Corse department of France on the island of Corsica.

In 1732 it was the site of an uprising by Corsican nationalists against the island's Genoese rulers.

It is now best known as the starting (or finishing) point of the GR 20 long distance walk.

The commune contains the Étang de Crovani, a coastal lagoon, that lies behind the Crovani beach (or Argentella beach) on Crovani bay.

Population

Monuments
Église Saint-Blaise de Calenzana

See also
Communes of the Haute-Corse department

References

Communes of Haute-Corse
Haute-Corse communes articles needing translation from French Wikipedia